The Linzhi mountain vole (Neodon linzhiensis) is a species of rodent in the family Cricetidae. It is endemic to mountainous parts of southern China.

References

Neodon
Mammals described in 2012
Rodents of China
Endemic fauna of China
Fauna of Tibet